Miloš Herbst (born 6 May 1942) is a Czechoslovak footballer. He competed in the men's tournament at the 1968 Summer Olympics.

References

External links
 

1942 births
Living people
Czech footballers
Czechoslovak footballers
Olympic footballers of Czechoslovakia
Footballers at the 1968 Summer Olympics
Footballers from Brno
Association football forwards
FC Viktoria Plzeň players